The Intraglandular deep parotid lymph nodes are a group of lymph nodes found inside the parotid gland.

References 

Lymphatics of the head and neck